In baseball, a strikeout occurs when a pitcher throws three strikes to a batter during his time at bat.  Twenty different pitchers have struck out at least 18 batters in a single nine-inning Major League Baseball (MLB) game as of 2016, the most recent being Max Scherzer of the Washington Nationals on May 11, 2016.  Four players have accomplished the feat more than once in their career; no player has ever struck out more than 20 batters in a nine-inning game.  Charlie Sweeney was the first player to strike out 18 batters in a single game, doing so for the Providence Grays against the Boston Beaneaters on June 7, 1884.  In spite of this, Bob Feller is viewed as the first pitcher to accomplish the feat, since his then-record 18 strikeouts was the first to occur during the 20th century and the live-ball era.

Out of the twenty pitchers who have accomplished the feat, fifteen were right-handed and five pitched left-handed. Five of these players have played for only one major league team.  Six pitchers—Steve Carlton, Roger Clemens, Randy Johnson, Nolan Ryan, Tom Seaver, and Max Scherzer—are also members of the 3,000 strikeout club.  Sweeney has the fewest career strikeouts in the group with 505, while Nolan Ryan, with 5,714, struck out more batters than any other pitcher in major league history.  Bill Gullickson and Kerry Wood are the only rookies to have achieved the feat.  Tom Seaver concluded his milestone game by striking out the final ten batters he faced, setting a new major league record for most consecutive strikeouts.

Of the eleven players eligible for the Baseball Hall of Fame who have struck out 18 batters in a game, six have been elected; all six were elected on the first ballot.  Players are eligible for the Hall of Fame if they have played in at least 10 major league seasons, and have either been retired for five seasons or deceased for at least six months.  These requirements leave two players ineligible who are active, two players ineligible who are living and have played in the past five seasons, and five who did not play in 10 major league seasons.

Players

MLB pitchers with 18 strikeouts in a nine-inning game

18 strikeouts in extra-inning games
Seven different pitchers have struck out at least 18 batters in an extra-inning Major League Baseball (MLB) game to date.  Only Nolan Ryan accomplished the feat more than once in his career and no player has ever struck out more than 21 batters in a game.

The following list is kept separate from the above list of pitchers who have struck out 18 or more batters in a nine-inning game.  This is due to the differing number of innings pitched during an extra-inning game, the lack of a definitive endpoint to the game that would otherwise allow for a fair comparison to be made, and the advantage of having more opportunities to strike out players during an extra-inning game as opposed to one lasting nine innings.

See also

3,000 strikeout club

Notes

References

External links
Top Individual Performances – List Retrosheet (scroll down)

Major League Baseball records
Major League Baseball lists
Baseball pitching